Rivière Bell Aerodrome  is located on the south-western shore of Anticosti Island, Quebec, Canada.

References

Registered aerodromes in Côte-Nord
Anticosti Island